Karamea War Memorial Library is a community library located in the settlement of Karamea in the West Coast region of the South Island of New Zealand.

The library was built in 1954 using a government grant, on land donated by the Board of Education. Originally the building was shared with the Plunket Society and St John's. When they moved out, the library took over the whole building and French doors were installed in the front.

The library is run entirely by volunteers, and is supported by a subscription service for members, with no lending fees or overdue fines. In 2005 there were 35 members. The collection is maintained through donations from local residents, and a rotating supply of items from the large Buller District Library in Westport.

References 

Libraries in New Zealand

Karamea